Will You Find Me is the fifth studio album by American indie rock band Ida, released in 2000 on Tiger Style Records.

Reception 

Will You Find Me was reviewed as "Album of the Week" in The New York Times, where Jon Pareles described the songs as being "like the whispers of uncertain lovers in a perpetual dance of vulnerability and assurance, parting and reconciliation." According to Eric Weisbard (writing in The Village Voice) "they've inflated everything that was irritating about them—and made their first memorable album.

Track listing

Personnel
Musicians
 Daniel Littleton – vocals, guitar, piano, wurlitzer, c3, silvertone organ, wineglass
 Elizabeth Mitchell – vocals, guitar, wurlitzer, mimbal
 Karla Schickele – vocals, bass, piano, organ, wineglass
 Michael Littleton – drums, percussion, melodica, accordi0n, wineglass
 Ida Pearle – violin
 Rick Lassiter – double bass
 Cecilia Littleton – viola, violin
 Sue Havens – accordion, clarinet
 Tim Thomas – piano
 Tara Jane ONeil – melodica
 Cynthia Nelson – harmonica
 Bernie Worrell – wurlitzer, moog synthesizer
 Elaine Ahn – cello
 Rose Thomson – plastic hose, piano
 Eddie Gormley – percussion
 Hanna Fox – percussion
 Andrew Hall – double bass
 Warn Defever – dictaphone, wire recorder, salt packet

Technical
 Greg Calbi – mastering
 Pat Graham – photography
 Stacy Wakefield – layout

References 

2000 albums
Ida (band) albums